Harry and Tonto is a 1974 road movie written by Paul Mazursky and Josh Greenfeld and directed by Mazursky. It features Art Carney as Harry in an Oscar-winning performance. Tonto is his pet cat.

Plot
Harry Coombes (Art Carney) is an elderly widower and retired teacher who is evicted from his Upper West Side apartment in New York City because his building is going to be razed to build a parking lot. He initially stays with his eldest son Burt's family in the suburbs, but eventually chooses to travel cross-country with his pet cat Tonto.

Initially planning to fly to Chicago, Harry has a problem with airport security checking his cat carrier. He instead boards a long-distance bus. He gets off in the countryside, annoying the driver, so Tonto can urinate, and is left there.  He buys a 1955 Chevrolet Bel Air from a used car salesman, although his driver's license is expired. During his episodic journey, he befriends a Bible-quoting hitchhiker (Michael Butler) and underage runaway Ginger (Melanie Mayron), with whom he visits an old sweetheart (Geraldine Fitzgerald) in a retirement home; she only half-remembers him.  He visits his daughter (Ellen Burstyn), a bookstore owner in Chicago, with whom he shares a prickly but mutually admiring relationship. Harry's shy grandson (who was supposed to take him back to New York) and Ginger end up going off to a commune in Colorado together in Harry's car, with his blessing, so he and Tonto are on their own again.

Continuing west, Harry accepts a ride with a health-food salesman (Arthur Hunnicutt), makes the acquaintance of an attractive hooker (Barbara Rhoades) on his way to Las Vegas, and spends a night in jail with a friendly Native American (Chief Dan George). He eventually arrives in Los Angeles, where he stays with his youngest son Eddie (Larry Hagman), a financially strapped real-estate salesman, before finding a place of his own with Tonto.

After Tonto dies, Harry is living alone, making new friends, enjoying the climate. He sees a young cat who looks exactly like Tonto, and follows it to the beach, where a child is building a sand castle.

Cast

Also appearing toward the end of the film as Celia is Sally Marr, mother of Lenny Bruce.

Production
Mazursky had James Cagney in mind for the role of Harry, but the actor turned the part down, as did Laurence Olivier and Cary Grant. Mazursky then saw Art Carney in a play and approached him. Carney initially declined as well, in part because he was about fifteen years younger than Harry, but he eventually agreed.

Cast as an elderly man, Carney, born in 1918, was actually only 13 years older than the actors who played his sons, Larry Hagman and Phil Bruns, and 14 years older than Ellen Burstyn, who played his daughter. Thanks to the makeup of Emmy winning artist Bob O'Bradovich, Carney was effectively transformed into the elderly Harry.

At the time, Carney noted that prior to his work in Harry and Tonto, he "never liked cats" but said he wound up getting along well with the cat in the film.

Reception
Nora Sayre of The New York Times wrote that the film had been "directed at far too slow a pace, which means that the comic possibilities and the social comment have been diminished. The muted style robs the picture of the point it's meant to make: that imaginative energy transcends the generations." Variety called it "pleasant, if commercially unexciting," with an "excellent" performance by Carney. Roger Ebert gave the film 4 stars out of 4, praising Carney for a performance that was "totally original, all his own, and worthy of the Academy Award it received." Gene Siskel of the Chicago Tribune awarded 3.5 out of 4 stars, calling it "an extremely funny movie without a single gag or a Bob Hope punch line. Rather, it's crammed full of believable people who say the kind of screwball things that make your head spin and smile." Charles Champlin of the Los Angeles Times described the film as "eventful, sentimental, enjoyable and firmly optimistic." Gary Arnold of The Washington Post called it "an unusually mellow and affectionate film comedy, but it might be wise to recommend it with a slight note of caution. It's what's known as a 'good little picture.'" In The Monthly Film Bulletin, Jonathan Rosenbaum wrote that the film "presumes to say something smart and 'sophisticated' about everything from urban renewal to Carlos Castaneda's medicinal lore, along with a continuous lesson about growing old gracefully that is dished out at every opportunity; yet it winds up telling us virtually nothing at all."

The film holds a score of 88% on Rotten Tomatoes based on 32 reviews, with an average grade of 7.3 out of 10.

Awards and nominations

See also
 List of American films of 1974

References

External links
 
 
 
 

1970s road comedy-drama films
1974 comedy-drama films
1974 films
20th Century Fox films
American road comedy-drama films
1970s English-language films
Fictional duos
Films about cats
Films about old age
Films directed by Paul Mazursky
Films featuring a Best Actor Academy Award-winning performance
Films featuring a Best Musical or Comedy Actor Golden Globe winning performance
Films scored by Bill Conti
Films shot in California
Films shot in Illinois
Films shot in New York City
Films shot in New York (state)
Films shot in the Las Vegas Valley
1970s American films